Ginger Williams may refer to:

Ginger Williams (singer), Jamaican born British lovers rock singer
James Williams (Welsh footballer), Welsh footballer
Virginia Williams, American actress